Globonectria is a fungal genus in the class Sordariomycetes. This is a monotypic genus, containing the single species Globonectria cochensis.

References

Bionectriaceae
Monotypic Sordariomycetes genera